Alexander Surtees Chancellor, CBE (4 January 1940 – 28 January 2017) was a British journalist.

Chancellor was educated at Eton College and Trinity Hall, Cambridge. He was the editor of the conservative Spectator magazine from 1975 to 1984. In 1986, after a spell as deputy editor of The Sunday Telegraph, he became the first Washington correspondent of the newly-launched quality broadsheet, The Independent, and subsequently launched and edited the paper's first Saturday magazine.  In 1993, he spent a year in the United States working as an editor at The New Yorker magazine, where he oversaw the "Talk of the Town" section. This experience was the basis of a memoir, Some Times in America, which both satirised the ordeal and recorded his deep affection for New York and the United States. It was published in both the UK and the U.S. in 2000.

In June 2014 he became editor of The Oldie magazine in succession to Richard Ingrams. Until January 2012, he contributed a weekly column in The Guardian, published in the "Weekend" supplement each Saturday. In March 2012, he began to contribute to The Spectator again, with a column entitled "Long Life".

Chancellor lived in Northamptonshire. He was the father of British model Cecilia Chancellor, and Eliza, who married the writer Alexander Waugh.  He was the grandson of Sir John Chancellor, the first Governor of Southern Rhodesia. He was the uncle of British actress Anna Chancellor. He was appointed a CBE in the 2012 Birthday Honours for services to journalism. He died on 28 January 2017, aged 77.

References

External links 
 Journalisted - Articles by Alexander Chancellor
 Articles by Chancellor in The Spectator

1940 births
2017 deaths
People educated at Eton College
Alumni of Trinity Hall, Cambridge
British male journalists
Commanders of the Order of the British Empire
English magazine editors
The Guardian journalists
The Spectator editors
The New Yorker editors
British expatriates in the United States